Moshi may refer to:

Places
 Moshi, Tanzania, a city
 Moshi Airport
 Moshi Rural, a district
 Moshi Urban, a district
 Roman Catholic Diocese of Moshi, a diocese located in the city of Moshi
 Moshi, Maharashtra, India
 Moshi, Shimen (磨市镇), a town in Shimen County, Hunan Province, China

People
 Haruna Moshi (born 1987), Tanzanian footballer
 Magdalena Moshi (born 1990), Tanzanian swimmer
 Moshi Kakoso (born 1968), Tanzanian politician

Other uses
 Moshi language (disambiguation)
 Moshi Monsters, a web browser game

See also
 Moschi (disambiguation)
 Moshi Moshi (disambiguation)
 Mochi (disambiguation)